I Can Do That is a Philippine reality television entertainment competition program shown on ABS-CBN. The series is an adaptation of the Israeli show of the same name produced by Armoza Formats, where celebrity contestants will be challenged to showcase various entertainment acts within one week of practice. It aired on March 11, 2017 to June 4, 2017, replacing Pinoy Big Brother: Lucky Season 7 and was replaced by Lethal Weapon. The program hosted by hosted by Robi Domingo and Alex Gonzaga.

Wacky Kiray was crowned as the first Greatest Entertainer on June 4, 2017, beating Cristine Reyes by a margin of 10.66%.

Format
Eight celebrities, referred to as iCANdidates, showcase their talents every week with different entertainment acts that performers perfected for years. Together with the guest performers, they will learn the skills needed and rehearse the act for a week. After one week of training, they perform their acts in front of a studio audience, with the public and fellow iCANdidates voting on the best performance of the week. At the end of 12 weeks, the celebrity with the most points from the judges earns a trophy, 1 million pesos, and the title of "The Greatest Entertainer".

Selection of Acts
At the start of the show, the guest entertainers perform their act on stage. If the iCANdidate likes what they see and wants to perform the act on the next episode, they must go down the iCAN steps. They may only do so once the sound and lighting cue flashes. The first iCANdidate at the last step locks in the act. Afterwards, the iCANdidate picks his or her partner in the act. If no one locks in the act after the performance, the hosts have the power to choose one iCANdidate who will perform it next week. The chosen contestant still gets to pick his or her partner. The process repeats until all iCANdidates are assigned to an act. The last act is automatically assigned to the remaining iCANdidates who were not able to choose an act.

Scoring system
After all iCANdidates have performed, the iCANdidates rank the acts through their smartphone — 3 points for the first place, 2 for second, and 1 for third; they may not vote for their own act. Once the iCANdidates have finished voting, the audience votes for the act they liked best. The act with the most votes from the audience receives 3 points. The audience vote is only valid if the majority of the audience voted (51%).

The act with the highest combined points from iCANdidates and audience becomes the "Entertainer of the Week" and receives ₱50,000.

Elimination
During a particular week, the two (three in double elimination week) iCANdidates with the lowest cumulative points are declared eCANdidate (short for elimination candidate) and hereby nominated for elimination. After a short message from each eCANdidate, the audience votes for who they want to save. The eCANdidate with the highest percent of votes is saved; the other eCANdidates are eliminated.

Contestants
Arci Muñoz, actress and singer with Philia
Cristine Reyes, actress on Kristine and Reputasyon
Daniel Matsunaga, Brazilian model, actor, footballer, host, businessman 
Gabriel Valenciano, dancer, musician, YouTube star
JC Santos, actor on Till I Met You
Wacky Kiray, stand-up comedian
Pokwang, actress/comedian
Sue Ramirez, actress

Competition summary
The table below shows the corresponding points and rank earned by the celebrity contestants each week.

Legend

Elimination

Week 7 (April 29)

Week 10 (May 20 & 21)

Week 11 (May 28)

Group Performances

Week 1 (March 11 & 12)

Week 2 (March 18 & 19)

Week 3 (March 25 & 26)

Week 4 (April 1 & 2)

Week 5 (April 8 & 9)

Week 6 (April 16 & 22)

Week 7 (April 23 & 29)

Versus Rounds
In the Versus Rounds, the selection process of the acts is the same, but their chosen partner is their competitor. In a pair (or trio in some acts), only one iCANdidate received the highest points from the other contestants. The audience's score system remained the same.

Week 8 (April 30 & May 6)

Week 9 (May 7 & 13)

Week 10 (May 14 & 20)

Solo Performances 
In Solo Performances, the scoring system is the same as the Group Performances', but 4 points are awarded by the iCANdidates to their first place, 3 to second, 2 to third, and 1 to fourth.

Week 11 (May 21 & 27)

Finals 
The show's finals, dubbed as The Battle for Greatness, took place on June 3 to 4. The judges were Boy Abunda and Judy Ann Santos.

The acts were selected on May 28.

The fourth placer received ₱100,000; third placer received ₱200,000; and the runner-up received ₱300,000. The winner received ₱1,000,000, and the title of "The Greatest Entertainer".

Week 12 (May 28, June 3 & 4)

Non-competition Performances
 Sam Milby, KZ Tandingan & Ogie Alcasid - "We Will Rock You" & "Let Me Entertain You"
 BoybandPH - "Larger than Life"
 Alex Gonzaga & Robi Domingo (AKA RoLex) - "Comedy Act with Crazy Duo"

References

ABS-CBN original programming
Philippine reality television series
2017 Philippine television series debuts
2017 Philippine television series endings
Filipino-language television shows